is a freelance announcer. She was previously a female announcer for Nippon TV.

Biography
She was from Fujinomiya, Shizuoka. Her place of birth is Tama, Tokyo. She had lived in Saitama Prefecture in the past. She joined in a campus park with Yoshie Takeuchi, Masako Yagi, Yuka Aiuchi and others who became announcers in the same year at other stations. Even now there are friends with Takeuchi.
She graduated from Sophia University Foreign Language Department English studies. She has been studying in Canada for a year while attending Kirayama High School. She joined Nippon TV in April 2008 after graduating from university. When the performers of Radio De Culture rushed into the entrance ceremony, she appeared in the interview from the performers.
From 1 April 2009, She was in charge of the first crown programme at Oguma no Bear Heya.
She was selected as a member of the announcer unit Bears formed on 9 July 2009.
From 7 October 2009 she served as the main caster for the first time at Oha!4 News Live.
She served as a sub-caster at news every. starting on 29 March 2010. In the following year, she won the position of the news caster in October and served as the successor of Izumi Maruoka.
She married a male non-celebrity office worker on 10 August 2013.
On 21 March 2014, she graduated from news every. On 31 March, she joined Zip! as the second generation news caster.
On 17 February 2017, she reported her first child pregnancy within the programme Zip!
On 31 March 2017, while serving as a news caster for Zip! for about three years, she graduated from the programme with her maternity leave. Erika Tokushima acted as her senior became the successor.
On 30 May 2017, she retired from Kewpie 3-bun Cooking, in which she served since 2012.
She gave birth to her first child on 24 July 2017.
On 18 December 2017 she plan to retire from Nippon TV which she served for ten years as she "would like to devote herself to child rearing after the first baby".
On 3 August 2020, she reported her second child pregnancy. She gave birth to her second child on 19 September.

Since June 2021, she formed a management alliance with Appre.

Past in charge/appearance programmes
 Regular
Ichioshi!! Nittele Ana-chan Rookies (Nittele Plus, 6 Sep 2008 – 5 Feb 2009)
Zoom In!! Super - Weather corner "Kuma Tore" (1 Oct 2008 to 2 Oct 2009 Weekdays, from 5 Oct 2009 until 23 Mar 2010, in charge of Mondays and Tuesdays)
Oha!4 News Live (Wednesdays–Fridays, 7 Oct 2009 – 26 Mar 2010)
Oguma no Bear Heya (2 Apr 2009 – 24 Aug 2010)
Bakana Furi shite Kiite mita (29 Mar 2010 – 21 Mar 2014, Weekdays)
news every. (Assistant 19 Apr – 20 Sep 2011)
Zip! (31 Mar 2014 – 31 Mar 2017, broadcast every day of the week newscaster)
Kewpie 3-bun Cooking (2 Jul 2012 – 30 May 2017, Mondays, Tuesdays, Saturdays)
Nittele Up Date! (7 Oct 2012 – unknown)
Uchimura Terrace (22 Jan 2016 – 30 Mar 2018)

 One-off
Sports broadcasting such as football
Radio De Culture (1 Apr 2008)
Tensai!! Company (21 Aug 2008, VTR appearance)
Asu no Tenki
NFL Club
Tensai! Shimura Dōbutsuen (23 May 2009, recorded Mar 2009) – Pankun's social studies training, as new announcer. Showed off her gospel singing.
Touch! eco 2009 Ima, Watashitachi ni dekiru koto. Zoom In!! Super × News Zero (7 Jun 2009) event reporter
Shōten Announcer Ōgiri (2176th, 2248th, 2327th broadcasts)
Monomane Grand Prix (21 Sep 2009)
Captain! TV (30 Apr 2010)
News Zero (24 Jun 2010) – Football World Cup Japan vs Denmark, relaying from the Danish Embassy's last appearance
Hirunandesu! (29, 30 Sep 2011, 17–19 Sep 2012, Asami Miura's representative)
24 Hour Television Kensuke Sasaki Family Charity Marathon Commentary (Together with Taichi Masu. 25, 26 Aug 2012)
Hana no Tele Kana-chan Part 1 (KTK, 16 May 2014) Guests on the day before the talk show at "Telegraph Hospitality Festa"
NNN Straight News (25–27 Aug 2014, 22–26 Aug 2016, 4–6 Jan 2017, Fumi Mori's agent)

Music videos
TVXQ – Kiss the Baby Sky
Cast appearance with three people with announcers Shinichi Hatori and Yukari Nishio

References

External links
 
Mika Oguma's official Instagram
Mika Oguma's official blog

Japanese announcers
Weather presenters
Sophia University alumni
People from Tama, Tokyo
People from Fujinomiya, Shizuoka
1986 births
Living people